Panchor Murai Football Club is a football club in Brunei, playing in the Brunei Super League. It takes its name from the village of Panchor Murai in Brunei-Muara District. It was formally established in 2009.

History
Panchor Murai FC formerly played at the district level of Brunei's football pyramid, under the name MPK Pancur Murai. They qualified for the Brunei Premier League in 2015, and finished fourth out of 11 clubs that season. They struggled for form in the season after, barely managing to survive the drop in eighth place.

Panchor Murai finished rock bottom in the 2017 Brunei Premier League and relegation was looming for the club, until it was saved via the pulling out of DSP United and Tunas FC from the league. They competed in the 2018-19 Brunei Premier League and managed another fourth-place finish.

When the Brunei Super League was expanded to 16 teams in 2020, Panchor Murai were announced to be participating in the league, making their top-flight debut after four seasons.

Current squad

References

Association football clubs established in 2009
Football clubs in Brunei